Tiacellia is a genus of skippers in the family Hesperiidae. It contains only one species, Tiacellia tiacellia, which is found on Aru.

References

External links
Natural History Museum Lepidoptera genus database
 Genus database

Erionotini
Hesperiidae genera
Monotypic butterfly genera